The Tour de Ribas is a one-day road cycling race held annually in Ukraine. It is part of UCI Europe Tour in category 1.2.

Winners

References

UCI Europe Tour races
Recurring sporting events established in 2016
2016 establishments in Ukraine
Cycle races in Ukraine
Sport in Odesa
Summer events in Ukraine